Dimitris Papadopoulos is a Greek professional basketball coach. During his club coaching career, Papadopoulos has coached in Greece, Cyprus, Tunisia, and Kosovo.

Coaching career
Papadopoulos started his basketball club coaching career with the Greek League club Panathinaikos Athens, where he worked as an assistant of Željko Obradović. After seven years at Panathinaikos, he moved to the Cypriot League club AEL Limassol. During his coaching career, he has also coached numerous Greek clubs, such as: Apollon Patras, Pagrati Athens, AEK Athens, Doxa Lefkadas, and Aris Thessaloniki. He also coached the Cypriot club Apollon Limassol, the Tunisian League club Étoile Sportive du Sahel, and the Kosovo League club Trepça. 

In 2017, Papadopoulos returned to the Greek club Apollon Patras. Papadopoulos was also an assistant coach of the senior men's Greek national team, from 2005 to 2008.

References

External links
KBA Profile
Eurobasket.com Profile

1971 births
Living people
AEK B.C. coaches
APOEL B.C. coaches
Apollon Patras B.C. coaches
Doxa Lefkadas B.C. coaches
Greek basketball executives and administrators
Greek basketball coaches
Ilysiakos B.C. coaches
M.E.N.T. B.C. coaches
Pagrati B.C. coaches